The 1986 California Attorney General election was held on November 4, 1986. Democratic incumbent John Van de Kamp defeated Republican nominee Bruce Gleason with 65.99% of the vote.

General election

Candidates
Major party candidates
John Van de Kamp, Democratic
Bruce Gleason, Republican

Other candidates
Carol L. Newman, Libertarian
Robert J. Evans, Peace and Freedom 
Gary R. Odom, American Independent

Results

References

1986
Attorney General
California